The 2019–20 Hawaii Rainbow Warriors basketball team represented the University of Hawaiʻi at Mānoa during the 2019–20 NCAA Division I men's basketball season. The Rainbow Warriors, led by fifth-year head coach Eran Ganot, played their home games at the Stan Sheriff Center in Honolulu, Hawaii. Hawaii was a member of the Big West Conference, and participated in their eighth season in that league. On November 6, Ganot took a temporary leave of absence to deal with an undisclosed medical issue. He returned to coaching on December 29 for their game against Maine. First year assistant Chris Gerlufsen served as acting head coach from November 6 to December 28, compiling an 8–5 record. They finished the season 17–13, 8–8 in Big West play to finish in a tie for fourth place. They were set to be the No. 4 seed in the Big West tournament. However, the Big West tournament was canceled amid the COVID-19 pandemic.

Departures

Incoming transfers

2019 Commitments

Roster

Schedule and results

|-
!colspan=9 style=| Exhibition

|-
!colspan=9 style=| Non-conference regular season

|-
!colspan=9 style=| Big West regular season

|-
!colspan=9 style=| Big West tournament

Source:

References

Hawaii Rainbow Warriors basketball seasons
Hawaii
Hawaii Rainbow Warriors basketball
Hawaii Rainbow Warriors basketball